Dooling is a surname. Notable people with the surname include:

Brendan Dooling (born 1990), American actor
Daniella Dooling (born 1967), American artist
John Francis Dooling Jr. (1908–1981), American judge
John Thomas Dooling (1871–1949), American lawyer
Keyon Dooling (born 1980), American basketball player
Lucinda Dooling (1954–2015), American actor
Martin Dooling (1886–1966), American soccer player
Maurice Timothy Dooling (1860–1924), American judge
Maurice T. Dooling Jr. (1889–1965), American judge
Peter J. Dooling (1857–1931), American politician
Richard Dooling (born 1954), American writer and screenwriter
Victoria A. Dooling (born 1944), American politician